Melimoyu is a stratovolcano (Mapudungun meli="four"; the name means "four breasts".) in Chile. An ice cap has developed on the volcano with a couple of outlet glaciers. Melimoyu has not erupted in recent times, but during the Holocene two large eruptions took place and ejected ash at large distances from the volcano.

Geography and geomorphology 

Melimoyu is a remote volcano in Chile northwest of the town Puyuhuapi and northeast from the Moraleda Channel inlet. There are four summits, all principally created by phreatomagmatic activity and which conspicuously rise above the surrounding area and give the mountain its name. It is one of the larger volcanoes in the region.

There are sixteen or seven glaciers on the mountain, clockwise from north they are named Glaciar Correntoso, Glaciar Melimoyu Este, Glaciar Marchant, Glaciar Melimoyu Sur, Glaciar Melimoyu Oeste, Glaciar Santo Domingo and Glaciar Anihue.

Geology 

This volcano together with Chaiten, Michinmahuida, Corcovado, Yanteles, Macá, Cay and Hudson is one of the volcanoes in the Southern Volcanic Zone which have been active during the Holocene and produced tephra deposits in the region.

The major Liquiñe-Ofqui Fault Zone has determined the position of a number of volcanic centres; it is a strike-slip fault that accommodates part of the relative movement between the Nazca and South America Plate. The position of Melimoyu is further controlled by a local fault system that runs parallel to the Liquiñe-Ofqui Fault, the Yanteles-Mentolat fault. Aside from Melimoyu, the volcanoes Mentolat and Yanteles, the Puerto Bonito hot springs as well as local bays and estuaries are influenced by this fault system. Beyond tectonic and volcanic phenomena, the Patagonian Ice Sheet has been active in the region, leaving lakes and fiords.

Composition 

Tephras from Melimoyu range from basalt over andesite to dacite. They contain phenocrysts of plagioclase plus clinopyroxene and orthopyroxene, but also hornblende, olivine and quartz and less common amphibole and biotite.

Climate 

The climate at Melimoyu is cold and oceanic, with cold fronts from Antarctica, westerly winds and synoptic systems from the Pacific Ocean dominating the climate. Summers are short and cold and there is abundant precipitation with no dry season; where orographic enhancement occurs precipitation can reach .

Eruption history 

Two large Holocene eruptions have been identified at Melimoyu, called MEL1 and MEL2 and whose deposits are known as the La Junta and Santa Ana tephras respectively. The larger MEL1 eruption occurred between 2,790 – 2,740 years ago and produced a layered basaltic-dacitic tephra consisting of pumice with lithics and scoria inclusions. The MEL2 eruption took place about 1,680 ± 100 calibrated radiocarbon years ago and consists of pumice of andesitic composition.

Other findings of tephra are MEL2 layers at Laguna Junco and Laguna Las Mellizas. The compositions of the two tephras are different, with the MEL2 magma having formed possibly from leftover MEL1 magma. The MEL1 tephra is of basaltic trachyandesite to basaltic andesite composition and the MEL2 tephra is of trachydacite composition.

Two additional tephra layers, 8,300 and especially one 19,700 years old, at Río Cisnes may also have originated at Melimoyu and deposits from the latter eruption may also be preserved in the Ñirehuao valley. Glacial activity has otherwise removed much of the record of volcanic activity before the post-glacial.

A 350 ± 200 CE eruption at Melimoyu deposited ash as far as Antarctica, where it was found in the Siple Dome. This eruption together with volcanic eruptions of Calbuco and Taupo in New Zealand induced noticeable cooling and increased snowfall in Australia. There are no recorded historical eruptions aside from occasional seismic events.

The Chaiten eruption in 2008 has highlighted the hazard that volcanoes constitute, and thus a number of volcanoes including Melimoyu are monitored with seismic stations. Local towns such as Puerto Cisnes may experience tephra falls in case of renewed volcanic activity at Melimoyu, while lahars and lava bombs would threaten the area directly surrounding the volcano.

See also
 List of volcanoes in Chile
 List of Ultras of South America

References

Sources

External links 
 
 
 "Cerro Melimoyu, Chile" on Peakbagger
 

Volcanoes of Aysén Region
Mountains of Aysén Region
Stratovolcanoes of Chile
Holocene stratovolcanoes